Jung is a 2000 Indian Hindi-language action thriller film directed by Sanjay Gupta.  The film features Aditya Pancholi as the antagonist along with Sanjay Dutt, Jackie Shroff, Raveena Tandon and Shilpa Shetty.

The film has some similarities to the Hollywood film Desperate Measures.

Plot
Police Inspector Veer Chauhan is an honest and diligent man, who lives in India with his wife, Naina, and a son, Sahil. While Veer likes to go by the book, his partner, Inspector Khan, is exactly the opposite, reckless, and trigger-happy. When Veer is told that his son requires a bone marrow transplant, Veer does his best, but is unable to come up with any donor, and is told that Sahil may not live long. Veer finds out that the only person who has the same bone marrow is Bali, a criminal, and the only problem is Bali is not likely to even consider donating any organ of his body, as Veer was the one who had arrested him. A short while later, Bali appears to have a change of heart, agrees to be a donor, and is transported to the hospital, but escapes. So after escaping the hospital, Bali kills evil Inspector Khan. Bali manages to wear a police uniform, and he escapes the hospital.

Controversy
Producer Satish Tandon and Sanjay Gupta had differences during the making of this film. Gupta was disappointed by Tandon, who added unwanted scenes without Gupta's permission. This resulted in Gupta withdrawing himself from credits & he wasn't credited in the film. But in the end credits, he was credited. Sanjay Dutt, one of the best friends of Sanjay Gupta, refused to dub the film, and his voice was dubbed by another person.

Cast
 Jackie Shroff as Inspector Veer Chauhan
 Sanjay Dutt as Bali
 Raveena Tandon as Naina V. Chauhan 
 Aditya Pancholi as Inspector Khan 
 Shilpa Shetty as Tara, Balli's Girlfriend
 Saurabh Shukla as Musa
 Neeraj Vora as Lachmandas "Lacchu" Dholakia
 Jash Trivedi as Sahil V. Chauhan, Veer Chauhan's Son (as Master Jash)
 Sachin Khedekar as Doctor 
 Navin Nischol as Police Commissioner
 Sanjay Mishra as Isha

Music
Songs were very popular upon release. 
"Aaila Re Ladki Mast Mast" – Alka Yagnik, Anu Malik
"Kadi Te Aana Bali Di Gali" – Music Director: Anu Malik, Singer: Jaspinder Narula, Bali Brahmbhatt, Lyricist: Sameer
"She Gives Me Fever" – Anu Malik
"Dil Me Jigar Me Meri" – Kumar Sanu, Hema Sardesai
"Mere Bina Tum Na Rahoge" – Alka Yagnik, Kumar Sanu
"Ram Kare" – Pankaj Udhas, Karsan Sagathia
"Yadaa Yadaa Hi, Jang" – Hariharan, Mahalakshmi Iyer
"A Hu Maa Maa Miyaan" – Anu Malik

References

External links 
 

2000 films
2000 action thriller films
2000 crime thriller films
Indian action thriller films
2000s Hindi-language films
Indian chase films
Films scored by Anu Malik
Indian thriller drama films
Indian gangster films
Films directed by Sanjay Gupta
Indian crime thriller films
2000 thriller drama films